Nabrđe (Serbian Cyrillic: Набрђе) is a village in the municipality of Požarevac, Serbia. According to the 2002 census, the village has a population of 346 people.

References

Populated places in Braničevo District